Chansons is a Canadian music television series which aired on CBC Television from 1966 to 1969.

Premise
This series of folk music performances was produced in colour as a Canadian Centennial project. Shooting locations included Alberta, British Columbia, Newfoundland, Nova Scotia, Ontario, Quebec. Performers included Christine Charbonneau, Bonnie Dobson, Jean-Pierre Ferland, Sheila Graham,  Tom Kines, Claude Leveillee, Gordon Lightfoot, Catherine McKinnon, Joni Mitchell, The Travellers and George Walker.  Pauline Julien French Canadian singer and songwriter hosted in 1965-66, the pendant of "Chansons" also broadcast in French and called "Mon pays mes chansons", Gemma Barra (singer and songwriter) replaced Julien in 1966 and continued through 1967.

Scheduling
This half-hour series was broadcast Thursdays at 10:30 p.m. (North American Eastern time) from 3 November 1966 to 8 February 1967. It was rebroadcast for another run on Fridays at 5:30 p.m. from 4 July to 26 September 1969.

References

External links
 

CBC Television original programming
1966 Canadian television series debuts
1969 Canadian television series endings